The Santa Rosa–Paradise Peak Wilderness is a protected wilderness area in the southern part of the Santa Rosa Range in Humboldt County, in northern Nevada in the western United States.

External links 
 Official Humboldt–Toiyabe National Forest website
 NevadaWilderness.org
 National Atlas: Map of Humboldt–Toiyabe National Forest

Wilderness areas of Nevada
Humboldt–Toiyabe National Forest
Protected areas of Humboldt County, Nevada